Noel Mewett (born 2 April 1949) is a former Australian rules footballer who played with Carlton in the Victorian Football League (VFL).

Notes

External links 

Noel Mewett's profile at Blueseum

1949 births
Carlton Football Club players
Hobart Football Club players
Australian rules footballers from Tasmania
Living people